The Salt Mountain Limestone is a geologic formation in southern Alabama and Mississippi.

It is a Paleogene Period limestone formation. and preserves fossils dating back to the Paleogene period.

Name
The name Salt Mountain Limestone replaced the descriptive name "Coral limestone" with Glendon limestone and replaced the paleontologic name "Orbitoidal limestone" with Marianna limestone. Both of these limestones are exposed near Salt Mountain, "which is now considered to be a tilted block brought up by the Jackson fault.

See also

 List of fossiliferous stratigraphic units in Alabama
 Paleontology in Alabama

References

Limestone formations of the United States
Paleogene Alabama
Paleogene Mississippi
Thanetian Stage